Fauldhouse United Football Club are a Scottish football club based at Park View in Fauldhouse, West Lothian.

The club won the Scottish Junior Cup in 1946 and currently play in the East of Scotland Football League.

Club staff

Board of directors

Coaching staff

Source

Current squad
As of 27 October 2022

Managerial history

c Caretaker manager

¹ David Dunn and Mark Daly took interim charge of the team in 2019 due to Manager illness.

Honours
Scottish Junior Cup
Winner: 1945–46

SJFA East Region South Division
 Winner: 2007–08

Other honours
 Fife & Lothians Cup winners: 1992–93
 Edinburgh & District League winners: 1945–46
 East Region Division One winners: 1982–83, 1992–93
 East Region Division Two winners: 1981–82, 1996–97, 2001–02
 East of Scotland Junior Cup winners: 1944–45, 1945–46
 East Junior League Cup: 1981–82, 1982–83, 2002–03, 2003–04
 Brown Cup winners: 1945–46, 1960–61

References

External links 
 Club website (does not work)
 Facebook
 Twitter

 
Football in West Lothian
Football clubs in Scotland
Scottish Junior Football Association clubs
Association football clubs established in 1919
1919 establishments in Scotland
East of Scotland Football League teams